Professor Henry "Harry" Elderfield  (25 April 1943 – 19 April 2016), was Professor of Ocean Chemistry and Palaeochemistry at the Godwin Laboratory in the Department of Earth Sciences at the University of Cambridge. He made his name in ocean chemistry and palaeochemistry, using trace metals and isotopes in biogenic carbonate as palaeochemical tracers, and studying the chemistry of modern and ancient oceans - especially those of the glacial epoch and the Cenozoic.

Education
Elderfield received his education from Eston Grammar School. He attended the University of Liverpool obtaining a Bachelor of Science degree in chemistry (oceanography) in 1965. He worked as a research fellow in the Geology Department, Imperial College London between 1968 and 1969 whilst completing his PhD at the University of Liverpool in 1970.

Career and research
He was appointed a lecturer in the Department of Earth Sciences, University of Leeds in 1969, a position he held until 1982. From 1982 until 1989 he held the post of assistant director in research in the Department of Earth Sciences at the University of Cambridge. During this time he obtained a Master of Arts degree from the University of Cambridge in 1985, followed by a  Doctor of Science degree in 1989. The same year, he was made a reader in geochemistry at Cambridge, before being appointed to the chair of Professor of Ocean Geochemistry and Paleochemistry (Cambridge) in 1999.

Early career
His early career was focused on the behaviour of trace metals in oceans and their sediments, and on fluid flow through the oceanic crust and sediments under the influence of off-axis hydrothermal circulation. He became one of the first low-temperature geochemists to appreciate how radiogenic isotopes might be used to solve the problems of marine geochemistry, developing the seawater strontium isotope curve for the Cenozoic. 

He also worked on iodine speciation in seawater and porewaters, the separation of cerium from other rare earth elements in a classic example of redox behaviour; he has developed a precise mass spectrometric analysis method – and made the first-ever measurements of oceanic profiles for – 10 rare earth elements. The rare earths are now widely used as tracers in sedimentary geochemistry and palaeoceanography.

Later research
Elderfield's later research focused on ocean chemistry and paleochemistry, and his results have had a far-reaching impact on the academic geochemistry discipline. He contributed significantly to marine chemistry, most notably the fate of metals in hydrothermal processes, the formation of manganese nodules,< and the biogeochemical cycles of elements including iodine and strontium.

His latter interests included defining chemical proxies from biogenic carbonates and using them to understand the ancient ocean. He pioneered the development of foraminiferal magnesium thermometry, which has become accepted for the estimation of past ocean temperatures.

Selected publications
 Elderfield, H., Holland, D. & Turekian, K.K. (2003) Treatise on geochemistry. Elsevier Science, 646p
  Carbonate Mysteries
 The rare-earth elements in rivers, estuaries, and coastal seas and their significance to the composition of ocean waters
 Application of the Cerium anomaly as a palaeoredox indicator: the ground rules
 Sr isotope composition of sea water over the past 75 Myr
 Interstitial water iodine enrichments in sediments from the eastern Pacific
  The rare-earth elements in sea-water
 Rare-earth element geochemistry of oceanic ferromanganese nodules and associated sediments

Awards and honours

Fulbright Scholar, 1988
Prestwich Medal, The Geological Society 1993
Fellow of the European Association of Geochemistry, 2000
 Elected a Fellow of the Royal Society (FRS) in 2001
Urey Medal, European Association of Geochemistry, 2007
V. M. Goldschmidt Award, Geochemical Society, 2013

References

1943 births
2016 deaths
Fellows of the Royal Society
Fellows of St Catharine's College, Cambridge
British geochemists
Lyell Medal winners
Fellows of the American Geophysical Union
Rare earth scientists
Recipients of the V. M. Goldschmidt Award